is a Japanese term used to refer to the Buddhist monastic almsround.

Theravāda

In Theravāda Buddhism, takuhatsu is referred to by the Pāli term piṇḍacāra. Monks or nuns on piṇḍacāra go around town on foot with their almsbowl under their outer robe and make themselves available to the laity to receive almsfood (piṇḍapāta).

Owing, however, to the precarity inherent in almost all aspects of Theravāda monastic life, there is no guarantee of collecting enough food for the day, if any at all. This precarity is particularly observable outside the Indosphere, or even within it in times of societal or systemic crisis.

Mahāyāna

In the practice of takuhatsu, monks travel to various businesses and residences to chant sutras in Sino-Japanese (thus generating merit) in exchange for donations of food and money.

Monks generally wear traditional takuhatsu clothes reminiscent of medieval Japanese garb and wear the names of their monasteries on their satchels to confirm their identities. This system is used by Zen monks in training to beg for their food, and is generally done in groups of ten to fifteen. The group walks through a street in single-file, chanting , and the faithful gather to fill their alms bowls. This is the monks' offering of the Dharma and their lives of guardians of the Dharma to the people. According to Zen tradition, the givers should be grateful.

References

See also
Mendicant

Buddhist monasticism
Alms in Buddhism